Miss Universe Kosova is a national beauty pageant that sends representatives from Kosovo to the Miss Universe pageant.

History

In 2008, On 4 April 2008, Fadil Berisha - photographer of Miss Universe's official photos - hosted Kosova's inaugural pageant where Zana Krasniqi was crowned. She went on represent Kosova at the Miss Universe pageant. This was the first appearance in a Miss Universe pageant for Miss Kosova following the country's declaration of independence on February 17, 2008.

In 2013 Fadil Berisha and Agnesa Vuthaj took control of Miss Kosovo and retrieved the Miss Universe franchise. This happened after the previous Miss Universe Kosovo director, Agron Selimi and team made the decision to send their winner to Miss World. Thus, winners for Miss Earth and Miss Universe pageant is being held under single pageant.

In 2018 Revista VIP Club took over the franchise of Miss Universe in Kosovo under the direction of TV producer Labinot Gashi. The company also holds the franchise for Miss Universe in Albania.

Titleholders
The following is a list of winners. From 2008 to present.

Titleholders under Miss Universe Kosovo org.

Miss Universe Kosovo

The first titleholder in Zana Krasniqi who eventually placed as a Top 10 finalist at the 2008 Miss Universe pageant. She is the first ever Kosovar woman to enter and place in the contest, finishing 6th, just two tenths of a point from the top five. The following year turned out to be another success for the Miss Universe Kosovo pageant: Marigona Dragusha, known as "Gona Dragusha", placed second runner-up to Miss Universe 2009 in the Bahamas making her to be the first delegate from Kosovo to make it top the top five. In terms of placements, Kosovo has been one of the most successful entrants into the Miss Universe pageant. The winner of Miss Kosovo represents her country at Miss Universe. On occasion, when the winner does not qualify (due to age) for either contest, a runner-up is sent.

Miss Earth Kosovo

The first delegate for Miss Earth from Kosovo is Mirjeta Zeka in 2002. She is the first delegate from Kosovo to join in a major beauty pageant while Kosovo was still then part of Yugoslavia or Serbia. However, as when the pageant concluded, she went home unplaced. The organization responsible for sending a delegate to Miss Earth was a different organization in 2002 and in 2003. It was in 2007 when Agnesa Vuthaj acquired the franchise and sent Miss Kosovo 2007 winner, Yllka Berisha, to Miss Earth 2008. However, she was unable to grab a spot in the semifinals as well. In 2014, Kaltrina Neziri was supposed to compete for Miss Earth but her visa was denied and was not able to compete. The organizer decided that she would compete for the following year, instead. To date, there is yet a Kosovan delegate to place in the Miss Earth pageant. One of the runners-up of Miss Kosovo represents her country at Miss Earth.

Past titleholders under Miss Universe Kosovo org.

Miss World Kosovo

Began 2018, one of the runners-up of Miss Kosovo represents her country at Miss World.

Notes
In 2013 the former Miss Universe Kosovo team pulled out of Miss Universe and decided to send their winning girl to Miss World 2013. Instead Fadil Berisha held a separate Miss Universe Kosovo edition in which Mirjeta Shala was crowned. However, in October Kosovo withdrew from the Miss Universe 2013 pageant because the security of Kosovo's contestant could not be assured in Russia and also Russia's non-recognition of the Kosovo's independence and passport.

See also
 Miss Kosovo
 Miss Albania
 Miss Universe Albania
 Miss Universe Kosovo 2012

Notes

References

External links
misskosova.info

Beauty pageants in Kosovo
Recurring events established in 2008
Kosovan awards
Kosovo
Kosovo